Caroline Suydam Berryman Spencer (December 28, 1861 – April 6, 1948) was a New York City and Newport, Rhode Island, socialite and the editor of Illustrated American.

Early life
She was born as Caroline Suydam Berryman on December 28, 1861 in New Haven, Connecticut, to a very wealthy and socially prominent family. She was a daughter of Charles Henry Berryman (1833–1893) and Harriett (née Whitney) Berryman (1838–1912). Among her siblings was Henry Whitney Berryman (husband of Edith "Esta" Green of Goole, England) and Georgiana Louise Berryman (wife of Swiss merchant Henry Casimir de Rham).

His paternal grandparents were Edwin Upshur Berryman and Maria (née Coster) Berryman, who both died young. Her maternal grandparents were Hannah (née Lawrence) Whitney and Henry Whitney (a son of Harriet (née Suydam) Whitney and Stephen Whitney, one of the wealthiest merchants in New York City). Among her extended family were aunts Cornelia Lawrence Whitney (the wife of John Gerard Heckscher), Maria Whitney (wife of Robert Cambridge Livingston), and Caroline Suydam Whitney (wife of Cornelius Fellowes).

Personal life

On October 3, 1882, She married Lorillard Spencer Jr. (1860–1912), a son of Lorillard Spencer and Sarah (née Griswold) Spencer. His paternal grandparents were Eleanora Eliza (née Lorillard) Spencer (daughter of Pierre Lorillard II) and William Augustus Spencer (son of U.S. Representative Ambrose Spencer and brother of John Canfield Spencer, the U.S. Secretary of War and Treasury).  Among his siblings was sister, Eleanor Spencer (wife of Don Virginius Cenci, 6th Prince of Vicovaro) and brother William Augustus Spencer, who died aboard the RMS Titanic. Together, they were the parents of several daughters who died in infancy, and a son:

 Lorillard Suydam Spencer (1883–1939), who served as president of Atlantic Aircraft and married Mary Ridgeley Sands in 1905. After their divorce in 1922, he married Katherine Emmons Force. 
 Lynette Suydam Spencer (1885–1887), who died young.
 Nina Gladys Spencer (1888–1888), who died in infancy.

They had a home in Newport known as Chastellux, "one of the most beautiful places in that city."

After the death of her husband, who owned the Illustrated American, she became a missionary in the Philippines.

She died on April 6, 1948 at her home, Blue Bird Cottage, in Newport, Rhode Island. She was buried in Green-Wood Cemetery in Brooklyn, New York.

References

External links

1861 births
1948 deaths
American women journalists
American magazine editors
American socialites
Writers from New Haven, Connecticut
Journalists from Connecticut
Burials at Green-Wood Cemetery
Women magazine editors
Spencer family of New York